Hockey Dad is an Australian surf rock band from Windang, New South Wales, Australia. The band consists of two members, drummer Billy Fleming and vocalist and guitarist Zach Stephenson.

History
The band was founded in 2013, although the members claim to have played together before being an official band with a third member Bailey Carson. The duo cites a band called Abstract Classic as an earlier project that fizzled out before they became Hockey Dad. Fleming and Stephenson were both born and raised in Windang, New South Wales, and lived two doors down from each other on Boronia Avenue in New South Wales, where they still reside. The members met in 1999 at the ages of three and four when they were playing a neighbourhood game of football on the street. Continuing to reside in the same town, the duo spends their time surfing at the beach and skating at the local park.

Name
The name of the band is derived from a joke in a 2003 episode of The Simpsons, "The Regina Monologues". In the episode, Hockey Dad is the name of a quickly-shown video game played by Bart Simpson and Milhouse Van Houten.

Record labels
Hockey Dad is currently associated with two record labels. Firstly, they are signed with the Australian independent label Farmer & the Owl/Inertia Music since 2014 for all dealings within Australia and the remainder of the world with exception of North America. The second label they are signed to is the independent label Kanine Records since 2015, for dealings within North America.

Musical style and influences
Hockey Dad credits the era of 1960s garage as their main influence. The duo also credits their musical inspiration to bands such as Bass Drum of Death, Sparkadia and Band of Horses. Growing up, Fleming quotes that listening to his brother's collection of '90s punk music helped develop his musical style. On the contrary, Stephenson indulged heavily into his father's 1980s Australian punk and rock musical selection.

Band members

Zach Stephenson 
Zach Stephenson was born on 15 November 1994 in Windang, Australia. For Hockey Dad, he plays the guitar as well as provides the main vocals for all their songs. Along with this, Stephenson can play bass and drums and is learning behind the scenes to record and produce music.

Billy Fleming 
Billy Fleming was born on 7 July 1996 in Windang, Australia, and plays the drums for Hockey Dad's records. Fleming can also play guitar and bass and is learning recording and production with Stephenson. Additionally, he is learning mastering in audio post-production.

Discography

Studio albums

Live albums

EPs

Singles
{| class="wikitable plainrowheaders" style="text-align:center;"
|+List of singles, with year released and album name shown
! Title
! Year
! Album
|-
! scope="row"| "Lull City"
| 2013
| rowspan="3"| Dreamin'''
|-
! scope="row"| "I Need a Woman"
| rowspan="2"| 2014
|-
! scope="row"| "Seaweed"
|-
! scope="row"| "Can't Have Them"
| 2015
| rowspan="4"| Boronia|-
! scope="row"| "So Tired"
| rowspan="3"| 2016
|-
! scope="row"| "Jump the Gun"
|-
! scope="row"| "A Night Out With"
|-
! scope="row"| "Homely Feeling"
| 2017
| rowspan="3"| Blend Inn|-
! scope="row"| "I Wanna Be Everybody"
| rowspan="2"| 2018
|-
! scope="row"| "Join the Club"
|-
! scope="row"| "I Missed Out"
| 2019
| rowspan="5"| Brain Candy|-
! scope="row"| "Itch"
| rowspan="4"| 2020
|-
! scope="row"| "In This State"
|-
! scope="row"| "Good Eye"
|-
! scope="row"| "Germaphobe"
|-
! scope="row"| "T's to Cross"
| 2022
| 
|-
|}

Music videos

Awards and nominations
APRA Awards
The APRA Awards are several award ceremonies run in Australia by the Australasian Performing Right Association (APRA) to recognise composing and song writing skills, sales and airplay performance by its members annually. 

|-
| 2021 || "I Missed Out" || Most Performed Rock Work || 
|-

J Award
The J Awards are an annual series of Australian music awards that were established by the Australian Broadcasting Corporation's youth-focused radio station Triple J. They commenced in 2005.

|-
| J Awards of 2018
| Blend Inn| Australian Album of the Year
| 

National Live Music Awards
The National Live Music Awards (NLMAs) are a broad recognition of Australia's diverse live industry, celebrating the success of the Australian live scene. The awards commenced in 2016.

|-
| National Live Music Awards of 2018
| Hockey Dad
| Best Live Act of the Year - People's Choice
| 
|-

Rolling Stone Australia Awards
The Rolling Stone Australia Awards are awarded annually in January or February by the Australian edition of Rolling Stone magazine for outstanding contributions to popular culture in the previous year.

! 
|-
| 2021
| Brain Candy''
| Best Record
| 
| 
|-

Tours

UK/Europe Tour 2016 
In May 2016, Hockey Dad announced their UK/Europe tour hitting 16 shows across United Kingdom, Netherlands, France, and Germany. The tour began on May 12, 2016 in Reading, England, and finished on June 4, 2016, in Nederweert, Netherlands. Due to the successful shows, Hockey Dad extended their tour and added another date on June 7, 2016, in Brighton, UK, performing alongside other bands.

US/Canada Tour 2016 
Hockey Dad also ran a tour across United States and Canada in support of their debut album. Lasting from the 10th of August to the 1st of September 2016, the tour consisted of 18 shows across fourteen states and two provinces. Musical group Muuy Biien played alongside Hockey Dad for this tour for all dates except that in San Francisco. This is the first tour Hockey Dad has performed in North America, previous visits only for music festivals.

Boronia Album Tour 
From September 24 to October 8, 2016, Hockey Dad performed a short Australian national tour reaching Brisbane, Brunswick, Sydney, Adelaide, and Perth. This tour was to locally promote their debut album and was completely sold out across all locations.

Benefit of the Doubt Tour 
On November 17, 2016, Hockey Dad announced their 2017 regional tour titled 'Benefit of the Doubt' tour. The tour ran from February 3, 2016 until March 4, 2016 and consisted of 8 shows in 8 cities across Australia.

Blend Inn Tour 
On January 16, 2018, Hockey Dad announced via Facebook that they would be touring to support the release of their second studio album Blend Inn. The tour ran from the 1st of March, 2018 to the 25th of March. The tour originally consisted of seven shows across five cities within Australia. However, after 6 of these shows sold out within the first 24 hours, the band added an extra 7 shows across Australia, bringing the total number of shows played to 14. On this tour, the duo performed in front of their biggest fans, Angus Edwards and Adam Richardson, who have been following the boys since early 2013.

Join The Club Tour
On 18 June 2018, Hockey Dad announced their second Australian tour for 2018. The string of shows was announced in support of their song 'Join The Club', which was released on their Sophomore album 'Blend Inn'. The tour took place in late September and October and included Melbourne, Sydney, Adelaide, Perth and Brisbane, with every show being sold out.

References

External links
 
 

2013 establishments in Australia
Australian indie rock groups
Australian surf rock groups
Musical groups established in 2013
Musical quintets
New South Wales musical groups
Rock music duos
Kanine Records artists